Princess Bamba Sutherland (29 September 1869 – 10 March 1957) was the last surviving member of the family that had ruled the Sikh Empire in the Punjab.  After a childhood in England, she settled in Lahore, the capital of what had been her father's kingdom, where she was a suffragette and a passionate advocate of self rule and independence of India. She was a close and personal friend of Indian revolutionaries whom she hosted like Lala Lajpat Rai.

Biography
Born as Bamba Sofia Jindan Duleep Singh, she was the eldest daughter of Maharaja Duleep Singh and his Egyptian first wife Bamba Müller. Bamba was the daughter of Ludwig Müller, a German merchant banker of Todd Müller and Company, and Sofia, his mistress, who was of Abyssinian (Ethiopian) descent. Bamba was born on 29 September 1869, in London. She led an unusual life as her father (the ruler of the Punjab) had been brought to Britain as a child under the care of the East India Company, after the close of the Second Anglo-Sikh War and the subsequent annexation of the Punjab on 29 March 1849.<ref>The tragic life of Maharaja Dalip Singh By Reeta Sharma, The Tribune, February 20, 1999</ref>

Bamba's father was forcibly separated from his mother and brought up as a Christian. When Duleep returned from burying his mother in India he married an illegitimate girl who was working at a missionary school in Cairo. He brought her back to England as his wife and they lived a life of luxury and were known to Queen Victoria. Bamba was their first daughter and was named after her mother, her maternal grandmother, and her paternal grandmother respectively. The name "Bamba" means pink in Arabic. Her mother was brought up in Cairo and was of German and Abyssinian descent.

After Bamba's father was taken from her, Bamba's grandmother, Jind Kaur, escaped India for Nepal where she suffered a poor life. Eventually she was allowed to rejoin her son in England. Duleep collected her after special permission was given. Duleep was allowed by the British to visit India for the second time to bury his mother's ashes after she died in Britain, although the body had to remain at Kensal Green Cemetery for nearly a year whilst this was agreed. His mother's ashes were not allowed to be buried in Lahore but had to be placed in a memorial in Bombay.

Bamba lived at Elveden Hall until her mother died from kidney failure. She and the rest of her brothers and sisters were placed in the care of Arthur Oliphant, whose own father, Lt Col. James Oliphant, was her father's equerry. There she completed her schooling until she went to Somerville College at Oxford and in the United States at a medical college in Chicago, Illinois.

India
When Bamba decided to visit India, she placed an advertisement in a newspaper to hire a companion. The lady selected was Hungarian, Marie Antoinette Gottesmann, whose father was an Austro-Hungarian government official from the aristocratic Catholic upper class circles of Budapest. The two made a number of visits to India, settling in Lahore and in the hill station of Shimla to live just as her ancestors did for centuries. Lahore was the winter capital, while Shimla, the summer. Marie Antoinette met and married Umrao Singh Sher-Gil, a Sikh aristocrat, and they went to live in Hungary. Amrita Sher-Gil, a notable painter, was their daughter. Bamba settled alone in Lahore and in 1915 married the Principal of King Edward Medical College in Lahore - Dr David Waters Sutherland.

In 1924, permission was finally given for her grandmother's ashes to be interred in Lahore. Bamba supervised the transfer of ashes, including the funerary rites that were denied when Maharani Jindan passed in Kensington, from Bombay where they had been placed when her father had once visited India briefly. Her grandmother had died in 1863, and permission to perform rites and have her body interred with her husband had taken many years to be returned to India. It is a great Sikh taboo to not perform rites or cremation. Maharaja Duleep met Bamba's mother in Cairo on his way back from burying his mother's ashes. Bamba deposited the ashes in the memorial to Maharaja Ranjit Singh, her grandfather, in Lahore.

Sutherland was widowed in Lahore when her husband died in 1939. He had moved to Scotland many years previously, but she refused to, citing her love of her home country, in the capital of her people. She was an incredible hostess, bringing many revolutionaries that gave India independence. The home she lived in was affectionately called Gulzar (Rose Palace) and had a garden of exclusive rose varieties she cultivated herself. Her will specified that red roses be placed on her grave from time to time. She had many relatives who were related to Maharaja Ranjit Singh who lived in what is now India, Punjab. Her family's descendants through Maharaja Ranjit Singh, including the court administrators, still own land in Amritsar, India, where her grandfather had added all the gold to the Golden Temple, Harmandir Sahib. When she finally died, her equerry and her funeral were arranged by the United Kingdom Deputy High Commissioner in Lahore, as well as a few friends as most of her comrades and companions and relatives had escaped to India during partition. She refused to leave her home and Lahore, the capital of the Sikhs, as she could not part with their kingdom.

Legacy
Sutherland died on 10 March 1957, in Pakistan.

Bamba left a large quantity of important historical items to her secretary, Pir Karim Bakhsh Supra of Lahore, who gave them to the Pakistani government to be put on display publicly. Many items are in disrepair and kept in a collection that must be granted permission to be seen. The collection consists of eighteen paintings, fourteen watercolours, 22 paintings on ivory, and a number of photos and other articles. The collection was sold to the Pakistan government, and it is kept in Lahore Fort. It is known as the Princess Bamba Collection''.

The Persian distich on her gravestone has been translated as:
The difference between royalty and servility vanishes,
The moment the writing of destiny is encountered,
If one opens the grave,
None would be able to discern rich from poor.

Ancestry

References

External links

1869 births
1957 deaths
Alumni of Somerville College, Oxford
Women of the Sikh Empire
British debutantes
Indian people of Ethiopian descent
Indian people of German descent
Pakistani people of Indian descent
Punjabi people
Pakistani people of German descent
Pakistani people of Egyptian descent
Pakistani people of Ethiopian descent
19th-century Indian women
19th-century Indian people
20th-century Indian women
20th-century Indian people